The Tykocin Synagogue is a historic synagogue building in Tykocin, Poland. The synagogue, in mannerist-early Baroque style, was built in 1642.

History 
During the Nazi occupation of Poland in 1941, the synagogue was desecrated and then set up as a warehouse. After the end of the war, it remained in use as a warehouse for fertilizers. In 1965, a fire damaged the interiors.

The synagogue was thoroughly restored in the late 1970s. The historic wall paintings, most of which are decorative texts of Hebrew prayers, were restored. The elaborate, decorative ceiling was not reconstructed although some idea of the style can be gleaned from the design of the Torah Ark.

A former Beit Medrash (study and prayer hall) located across the street has been restored and is in use as a city museum.

Although no Jews now live in Tykocin, 40,000 tourists a year come to see the old synagogue, which remains "in lonely and unexpected splendor". The tourism has generated economic activity, including a cafe serving "Jewish-style" food and a bed-and-breakfast.

Gallery

See also
 List of mannerist structures in Northern Poland

External links

 Tykocin Synagogue photos
 Great Synagogue of Tykocin in the Bezalel Narkiss Index of Jewish Art

References

Former synagogues in Poland
Jewish museums in Poland
Religious buildings and structures completed in 1642
Jewish Polish history
Baroque synagogues in Poland
17th-century synagogues
Synagogues preserved as museums
Białystok County
Buildings and structures in Podlaskie Voivodeship
Museums in Podlaskie Voivodeship
1642 establishments in the Polish–Lithuanian Commonwealth
Mannerist architecture in Poland